Southern Bagging Company, also known as Builders Supply Co. and Spaghetti Warehouse, is a historic factory building located at Norfolk, Virginia. It was built in 1918, and is a three-story, five bay by three bay, rectangular brick building.  It has a flat roof and corbelled cornice.  The building served as a manufacturing facility for bags for the shipping of cotton and agricultural products from the Norfolk harbor.  The building subsequently housed Builders Supplies Corporation from 1924 to 1964. It housed a Spaghetti Warehouse restaurant from 1991 to 2001.

It was listed on the National Register of Historic Places in 2007.

References

Industrial buildings and structures on the National Register of Historic Places in Virginia
Industrial buildings completed in 1918
Buildings and structures in Norfolk, Virginia
National Register of Historic Places in Norfolk, Virginia
Bags
1918 establishments in Virginia